Burris Laboratory School is a kindergarten through twelfth grade public laboratory school located on the west side of Muncie, Indiana.  The school is a division of Ball State University and provides University pre-service teachers an opportunity for classroom observation and practice. The school also shares a campus with the Indiana Academy for Science, Mathematics, and Humanities. Currently Burris has implemented a system for middle school called impact.

History
The school was established in 1929 and is named after Benjamin J. Burris, the first president of what was then known as Ball Teachers College.  Originally part of the Muncie school district, it became independent in 1974. Its district is now coterminous with the entire state of Indiana. Students are admitted via a lottery system.

Athletics
Burris Laboratory School was affiliated with the Mid-Eastern Conference (MEC) from 1979 through the 2013/2014 school year, with the Owl serving as the school's mascot.  Burris has a girls' volleyball program with four national championships, and 21 state championships, 14 of which are consecutive. Starting in the 2014-2015 school year, the school is a member of the Pioneer Conference.

Notable alumni
 Greg Adams, music writer and reissue producer (class of 1988)
 Angelin Chang, Grammy-award winning classical pianist and music educator
 S. T. Joshi, award-winning literary scholar and editor (Class of 1976)
 Patrick Tovatt, actor (class of 1959)

See also
 List of high schools in Indiana

References

External links
Ball State University site for Burris
Historic photographs of Burris Laboratory School from the Ball State University Digital Media Repository

Educational institutions established in 1929
Public elementary schools in Indiana
Public middle schools in Indiana
Public high schools in Indiana
Vocational & technical high schools in Indiana
Laboratory schools in the United States
University-affiliated schools in the United States
Schools in Delaware County, Indiana
Ball State University
Buildings and structures in Muncie, Indiana
1929 establishments in Indiana